Mauro & Pluras tågluff (English: Mauro & Plura's Interrailing) was a Swedish travel and reality show that aired in early 2014, starring the musicians Mauro Scocco of Ratata(band) and Plura Jonsson of Eldkvarn. It is a spin-off of their earlier work, the cooking show Mauro & Pluras kök.The show was produced during the spring of 2013.

The show follows the two musicians as they go on an interrail journey along the French Atlantic coast, via the Pyrenees to Camargue by the Mediterranean Sea. During the show, the cameras follow their experiences, discussions and restaurant visits while Kjell Alinge narrates. Alongside is illustrator Love Nordberg, whose aquarelle paintings are shown during the introduction and as a divider in the show.

Route 
The destinations for each episode are:

 Paris – Deauville/Trouville – Honfleur – Cabourg – Omaha Beach
 Cancale – Dinard – Mont Saint-Michel – Île-de-Bréhat
 Brest – Huelgoat – Pont-Aven – Riec-sur-Belon – Bodil Malmsten's Finistère
 La Rochelle – Île de Ré
 Bordeaux
 Saint-Jean-de-Luz – Saint-Jean-Pied-de-Port – San Sebastián
 Carcassonne – Canal du Midi (with narrowboat)
 Canal du Midi (with narrowboat) – La Grande-Motte – Camargue

Reviews 
The show was given a positive review by Björn Finér from TVDags who called it a "welcoming cozy-sullen return". In his review of the accompanying album, Joacim Forsén from Aftonbladet positively highlighted Scocco and Jonsson's unpretentious DIY spirit by including the recorded "junk" parts in the show, creating a "unique easy-going after-party atmosphere of unpretentious shots and a playful botanization among genres". Mathias Jensen from Gaffa called Mauro & Pluras tågluff their most becoming production.

References 

2014 Swedish television series debuts
Swedish reality television series
TV3 (Sweden) original programming
2010s travel television series